Tarweed or tarplant is a common name for several plants and may refer to:

Various plants in the tribe Madieae of the family Asteraceae:
Anisocarpus madioides
Blepharizonia
Centromadia
Deinandra
Harmonia
Hemizonella
Hemizonia
Holocarpha
Jensia
Madia
Amsinckia lycopsoides
Cuphea viscosissima